Angelika Mikk (née Tendermann; born on 8 September 1973, Tallinn) is an Estonian opera singer and actress.

In 2004, she graduated from Estonian Academy of Music and Theatre.

She made her opera debut in 2003 at Estonian National Opera. Since 2003, she is a freelance opera singer.

She has also participated on several Estonian television series, including, Padjaklubi, Kättemaksukontor, Tupiktänava mehed and Pilvede all.

Opera roles

 Juliet (Britten's "The Little Sweep" (2003))
 Sofia (Rossini's "Signor Bruschino")
 Lucy (Menotti's "Telephone")

External links

References

Living people
1973 births
21st-century Estonian women opera singers
Estonian television actresses
Estonian Academy of Music and Theatre alumni
Singers from Tallinn
Actresses from Tallinn